André Deutsch  (15 November 1917 – 11 April 2000) was a Hungarian-born British publisher who founded an eponymous publishing company in 1951.

Biography
Deutsch was born on 15 November 1917 in Budapest, Hungary, the son of a Jewish dentist. He attended school in Budapest and in Vienna, Austria. The Anschluss led to him fleeing Austria because he was Jewish, and in 1939, he settled in Britain, where he worked as floor manager at the Grosvenor House Hotel in London. When Hungary entered the Second World War on the side of the Germans in 1941, Deutsch was interned for some weeks as an "enemy alien".

After having learned the business of publishing while working for Francis Aldor (Aldor Publications, London), with whom he had been interned on the Isle of Man and who had introduced him to the industry, Deutsch left Aldor's employment after a few months to continue his burgeoning publishing career with the firm of Nicholson & Watson. After the war Deutsch founded his first company, Allan Wingate, but after a few years was forced out by one of his directors, Anthony Gibb. André Deutsch Limited began trading in 1952.

His small but influential publishing house was active until the 1990s, and included books by Jack Kerouac, Wole Soyinka, Earl Lovelace, Norman Mailer, George Mikes, V. S. Naipaul, Ogden Nash, Eric Williams, Andrew Robinson, Philip Roth, Art Spiegelman, John Updike, Margaret Atwood, Charles Gidley Wheeler, Helene Hanff, Peter Benchley, Leon Uris, Molly Keane, Michael Rosen, Quentin Blake, John Cunliffe, and Ludwig Bemelmans. Deutsch employed dedicated editor Diana Athill, who in 1952 was a founding director of the publishing company that was given his name (and who in her memoir Stet described him as "possibly the most difficult man in London"). A number of book series were established including The Language Library, Grafton Books (works on librarianship, bibliography and book collecting) and the Introduces guides.

In the 1989 Queen's Birthday Honours Deutsch was appointed a CBE.

Deutsch died in London on 11 April 2000, aged 82.

In popular culture
Author John le Carré based his recurring character Toby Esterhase on Deutsch, both in physical appearance and in replicating Deutsch's unique manner of speech:

Current imprint
The name "André Deutsch" is now an imprint of Carlton Publishing Group, which purchased the company from Video Collection International Plc.

See also
 List of publishers
 Paul Hamlyn
 George Weidenfeld

References

Further reading
 Abel, Richard, and Gordon Graham (eds), Immigrant Publishers: the impact of expatriate publishers in Britain and America in the 20th century. New Brunswick, NJ: Transaction Publishers, 2009. 
 Athill, Diana, "André Deutsch: The Great Persuader", in: Logos, 14:4, 2003, pp. 174–180.
 Athill, Diana, Stet: A Memoir. London: Granta, 2000. 
 Attallah, Naim, "No Longer With Us: André Deutsch" (including interview with Deutsch from Singular Encounters), quartetbooks.wordpress.com, 5 July 2010.
 Calder, John, "André Deutsch: Idiosyncratic publisher who enlivened a staid British profession with an outsider's flair, charm and insight", The Guardian, 12 April 2000.
 Lyall, Sarah, "Andre Deutsch, 82, Publisher Who Invigorated British Scene", The New York Times, 14 April 2000.
 Norrie, Ian, Mentors and Friends: Short Lives of Leading Publishers and Booksellers I Have Known. London: Elliot and Thompson, 2006.

External links 
 André Deutsch website
 André Deutsch Collection at Oxford Brookes University
 André Deutsch Publishing Archive at the McFarlin Library, University of Tulsa

1917 births
2000 deaths
20th-century British businesspeople
British book publishers (people)
British Jews
British people of Hungarian-Jewish descent
Commanders of the Order of the British Empire
Hungarian emigrants to the United Kingdom
Hungarian Jews
Jewish emigrants from Austria to the United Kingdom after the Anschluss
People from Budapest
People interned in the Isle of Man during World War II